Still Life is the seventh studio album by the American pop/rock band the Connells, released in 1998. It is the last album to include founding member Peele Wimberley on drums.

Critical reception
The Washington Post wrote: "Several numbers, such as 'Curly's Train' and 'Glade', dip into Uncle Tupelo-style alternative-country, but the best numbers, such as 'Circlin' ' and the title track, boast the jaded, ironic take on the Byrds and Beatles that defined Southeastern indie-rock in the '80s." Salon called the album "engaging, unmistakably Southern guitar-rock with smart, darkish lyrics and an irreproachable melodic sense." Stereo Review thought that "with an abundance of talent and the wherewithal to refine it into polished pop, the Connells craft a fetching piece of sonic artwork in Still Life."

Track listing
All songs written by Mike Connell, except where noted.
"Dull, Brown And Gray" - 3:11
"The Leper" - 3:06
"Bruised" (Peele Wimberley) - 3:05
"Curly's Train" (George Huntley) - 3:46
"Gauntlet" (Doug MacMillan) - 3:31
"Glade" (Steve Potak) - 3:30
"Soul Reactor" - 3:09
"Still Life" - 3:09
"Crown" - 3:57
"Circlin'" (MacMillan) - 2:44
"Gonna Take A Lie" (Peele Wimberley) - 3:37
"Queens Of Charades" (Huntley) - 3:32
"Pedro Says" (David Connell) - 3:25

Personnel 
The Connells
Doug MacMillan - lead vocals
Mike Connell - guitar, vocals
George Huntley - guitar, piano, vocals, lead vocals on "Curly's Train" and "Queen of Charades"
Steve Potak - keyboards
David Connell - bass
Peele Wimberley - drums, percussion

Additional personnel
Linda Vogel - background vocals
Jim Scott - background vocals

Technical personnel
Jim Scott - producer, mixing, engineer
Tim Harper - producer, arranger, production engineer
Greg Fidelman - engineer
Billy Joe Bowers - engineer
Mike Scotella - engineer 
Bill Mooney - design
Axl Jansen - photography

References

1998 albums
The Connells albums
TVT Records albums